Leni Wylliams (born Leonard Morrell Williams, January 15, 1961 – September 13, 1996) was an African-American dancer and choreographer.

Early life
Leonard Morrell Williams was born in Denver, Colorado, on January 15, 1961. He later became known as Leni Wylliams.

He graduated in 1979 from Thomas Jefferson High School (Denver).

Wylliams's mother was Allice (Williams) Ollie; stepfather was Esau Ollie; father was Harold Williams Jr.; and three sisters were Kimberly, Dana, and Rebecca Williams -  all who survived him.

Career
Wylliams began to pursue dance training at the Denver-based school of Cleo Parker Robinson during his early teens and subsequently advanced to performing in her company – Cleo Parker Robinson Dance Ensemble – until 1982 when at the invitation of Eleo Pomare, he moved to New York City to appear with Eleo Pomare Dance Company. Ultimately, Pomare set all of his solos on Wylliams - entrusting Wylliams to dance all of the roles he - Pomare - had created and performed for himself.

Wylliams also danced in the companies of José Limón, Pina Bausch, Paul Sanasardo, Donald Byrd, Fred Benjamin, and Rod Rodgers, as well as with Netherlands Danse Theatre and Forces of Nature Dance Theatre Company.

Wylliams choreographed for ballet and modern dance companies around the world. Among dances he choreographed are Ascension, Baharini, Evidence of Souls Not Seen, In the Rain, Minus Him, Quiet City, Shah Tah Tee and Sweet In The Morning. Wylliams taught in Russia, East Germany, Asia, and throughout the United States. He, too, was a visiting professor of dance at the University of Missouri-Kansas City's Conservatory of Music.

In Boston during the late-1980s-into-very-early-1990s, Wylliams was interim-artistic-director of the Danny Sloan Dance Company; was founding artistic director of Wyll Danse Theatre; collaborated with acclaimed television producer Barbara Barrow-Murray; appeared with Sarah Caldwell’s Opera Company of Boston [OCB]; was assistant choreographer to renown-Broadway-choreographer Patricia Birch for the OCB’s staging of Leonard Bernstein's Mass, as well as for an OCB engagement at the Bolshoi in Moscow.

Wylliams was assistant choreographer for  Martin, a ballet tribute to Martin Luther King Jr. with music and libretto by Gordon Parks which premiered in Washington, D.C. during 1989 and was screened on national television on King's birthday in 1990. Wylliams, too, assisted Carmen de Lavallade in choreographing the Metropolitan Opera’s 1990 staging of Porgy and Bess .

Wylliams met Mary Pat Henry while both were guest artists at a festival in Vancouver, BC, Canada.  It was there that they both became aware of their remarkably-similar visions of dance and its history.  Soon after, Henry relocated to the University of Missouri–Kansas City to teach at its Conservatory of Music and then beckoned Wylliams to move there too.  During 1991, the two of them founded Wylliams/Henry Danse Theatre [WHDT] and were its co-artistic-directors.

During 1992, Wylliams choreographed, in collaboration with Heather White, what was to become his signature solo - Sweet In The Mornimg - with vocals by Bobby McFerrin.

Wylliams performed his Sweet In The Morning during Dance “Masters Night” (curated by Dianne McIntyre) Wednesday, July 3 at the 1996 National Black Arts Festival [NBAF] in Atlanta, GA. That signature solo danced by Wylliams was shown along with a select array of presentations by other NBAF performance artists in a televised documentary of the festival - Ark of the Spirit - with Avery Brooks produced by Turner Broadcasting System.

Death and legacy

Murder
The morning of Friday, September 13, 1996, Wylliams was found murdered – bludgeoned, doused with a flammable substance, and set on fire – inside the bedroom of his Kansas City home.  The Jackson County medical examiner's office determined Wylliams had died of blunt trauma and smoke inhalation.

On September 17, 1996, suspect Timothy O. Evans - 26 years old - was apprehended and charged with first-degree murder and armed criminal action.  Evans’ fingerprints had been found on Wylliams’ car, on the front door of his home, and on the 10-pound steel dumbbell used in the bludgeoning. Wylliams’ blood was found on shoes and clothing belonging to Evans.  Prior to his encounter with Wylliams, Evans had told acquaintances he was going out to “jack” [rob] someone.

December 11, 1997, Evans was found guilty of first-degree murder, first-degree arson and armed criminal action.  On January 30, 1998, he was given a life sentence in the beating death, a life sentence for armed criminal action, plus 15 years for first-degree arson.

Praise
Fellow-artistic director Mary Pat Henry described Wylliams as having “one of the most articulate bodies” in which one “could see every muscle and every move of the dance as it moved through him”.  Wylliams was lauded by  Kansas City Star classical-music-editor Scott Cantrell as having danced with “the quality of radium” and moving “with power and fine-tuned precision, but also with a riveting ecstasy”. After being witness to a solo danced by Wylliams, Katherine Dunham told Wylliams “you are pure poetry”.

The November 1983 performance by Wylliams as "Profit Jones" in Eleo Pomare’s Radiance of the Dark during Eleo Pomare Dance Company's 25th anniversary season was reported in a New York Times review as being “show stopping”.  A May 1985 NY Times review of dances presented by José Limón Dance Company's  Clay Taliaferro cites “the impressive Leni Wylliams”. During Fred Benjamin Dance Company's twentieth year celebration in 1989, Wylliams danced the solo Illuminations which Benjamin remarked "just about stopped the show!"

Gordon Parks recalled that one of his most challenging projects was Martin and that the one who had kept him together was Wylliams.

While creating choreography, Wylliams was seen being “almost trance-like” as though “he had a channel to The Devine” with material pouring out “fast and so furiously” generating “beautiful ballets in a short period of time”.

As an instructor, Wyllliams was praised as having the ability to inspire dancers to believe in themselves – to believe the impossible was possible. Dancers adored Wylliams and trusted him implicitly.  If a class was stuck, Wylliams would sing Summertime and tell the students to start moving to it.  At question-and-answer sessions following end-of-residencies performances during which Wylliams “wowed” student audiences, he was often begged to sing Summertime, as he had so often done while he taught.

Tributes
Awards established and/or named in honor of Leni Wylliams :

 Leni Wylliams Award presented by Cleo Robinson Dance, Denver:  Saluting achievements in Choreography and Innovation.
 Summertime Award presented by Coquitlam District Music Festival, Port Coquitlam, BC, Canada :  A glass memorial trophy with a willow tree etched into it - inscribed "In memory of Leni Wylliams, an adjudicator, that had soul, artistry, and the incredible ability to make young dancers believe in themselves" - presented with a small bursary during Honour Performance at the end of each Coquitlam District Music Festival.

Wylliams/Henry Danse Theatre

The company built by co-artistic directors Leni Wylliams and Mary Pat Henry changed the face of dance in the Midwest. Wylliams/Henry Danse Theatre - now known as Wylliams/Henry Contemporary Dance Company - continues to present with a range of more than 100 works that is as broad as any company in America.  It's known for its beautiful, athletic style. and its presentation of powerful, uplifting works from a rich archive of American modern dance.  The company's repertory - ranging from the lyric to the avant garde - contains not only their own works, but dances by an array of internationally acclaimed choreographers.

See also
 List of dancers

References 

African-American male dancers
African-American choreographers
American choreographers
American male dancers
Dancers from Colorado
Modern dancers
1961 births
1996 deaths
1996 murders in the United States
20th-century American dancers
20th-century African-American people